Black Caesar is a soundtrack album recorded by James Brown for the film of the same name and released in 1973. The album also features The J.B.'s and Lyn Collins.

Critical reception 

In a 1980 consumer guide to James Brown's albums following the dissolution of King Records, Robert Christgau of The Village Voice gave Black Caesar a "D+" and stated, "You listen to Brown for music, not songs, but that's no reason to expect good soundtrack albums from him. He should never be allowed near a vibraphone again."

However, other critics wrote more positively about the album. In a later retrospective review, Mark Deming of AllMusic gives the album three-and-a-half out of five stars and feels that, "like most soundtrack albums of the period, Black Caesar sounds rather scattershot, especially when the music is divorced from the film's narrative," but observed "several top-notch tracks", including "The Boss", "Make It Good to Yourself", and "Mama's Dead". Deming adds that "Fred Wesley's superb horn charts, Jimmy Nolen's percussive guitar, and Jabo Starks' dead-on-the-one drumming make even the weaker instrumental cuts worth a quick listen". Dave Thompson calls it a "kick-ass soundtrack" and "nothing short of a full frontal funk assault."

Track listing

Personnel 
Credits for Black Caesar adapted from Allmusic.

 James Brown – arranger, conductor, producer, vocals
 Bob Both – mixing, production supervisor
 Lyn Collins – vocals
 Jeff Faville – redesign
 Joseph M. Palmaccio – digital remastering
 Harry Weinger – liner notes
 Fred Wesley – arranger

Charts

References

James Brown albums
1973 soundtrack albums
Polydor Records soundtracks
Drama film soundtracks